One Hour To Zero is a film made in 1976 by Charles Barker Films for the Children's Film Foundation.

Plot
Set in the fictional Welsh village of Llynfawr, Steve (Andrew Ashby) runs away from home after an argument with his father. His sister Maureen (Jayne Collins) enlists the help of his friend Paul (Toby Bridge) to find him, although Paul is initially unwilling to help. He eventually finds Steve in an abandoned slate quarry. On their return they find the village deserted and are unaware that the village has been evacuated due to the danger of an explosion at a nearby power station. They are unable to contact the outside world as the village's only public telephone was earlier vandalised by Steve in an attempt to get money from it. While searching the village they stumble across Mike Ellis (Dudley Sutton) robbing the local cash and carry and Paul is locked in the quarry while Mike makes his escape. Steve tries and fails to set him free but Paul's father arrives. While the two children are lost, Steve's father returns to his place of work - the power station - in an attempt to correct the cooling fault, and prevent the disaster. He eventually succeeds with seconds to spare, and is reunited with his son.

Cast

Production
Most of the film was shot on location in North Wales, the nuclear research station featured was actually Trawsfynydd nuclear power station in Gwynedd. The term "nuclear" does not appear in the dialogue at all, although Paul does refer to the "experimental reactor".

References

External links
 
 cftf.org.uk: Children's Film and Television Foundation, CFTF Films Catalogue, "One Hour to Zero"

1970s children's films
1976 films
British children's films
Children's Film Foundation
Films directed by Jeremy Summers
1970s English-language films
1970s British films